María Antonieta  may refer to:

 María Antonieta Cámpoli (born 1955), Miss Venezuela in 1972
 María Antonieta Collins (born 1952), Mexican journalist, TV host and author of
 María Antonieta de Bográn (born 1955), former 1st Vice President of Honduras (2010–2014)
 María Antonieta de las Nieves, stage name of María Antonieta Gómez-Rodríguez, (born 1950), Mexican actress, comedian, and singer
 María Antonieta Duque (born 1970), Venezuelan TV presenter, comedian and actress
 María Antonieta Gutiérrez Venezuelan telenovelas script writer
 María Antonieta Hernández (born 1958), Mexican gymnast
 María Antonieta Pérez Reyes (born 1963), Mexican politician
 María Antonieta Pons (1922–2004), Cuban-born Mexican film actress and dancer
 María Antonieta Rodríguez Mata (born 1969), Mexican former police officer and convicted drug lord
 María Antonieta Alva (born 1985), Peruvian Finance Minister

See also

Marie Antoinette (disambiguation)
Maria Antonia
María Antonietta
Maria Antonina